Henry T. Perea (born June 29, 1977 in Fresno, California) was elected to the California State Assembly in November 2010. He is a Democrat who formerly represented the 31st district, encompassing western Fresno.

Career 
Perea has been described as a leader of the moderate, more business-friendly wing of the state legislature's Democrats.  On December 1, 2015 he announced that he would resign his seat at the end of 2015, a year early, to seek a lucrative position as a lobbyist.

Prior to his election to the Assembly, Perea served on the Fresno City Council from 2003 to 2010. He was first elected to the council at the age of 25 and served as council president in 2007.

Perea also ran, unsuccessfully, in the 2008 Fresno mayoral election.

Family 
He is married to Yahaira Garcia-Perea and they have three children.

His father, Henry R. Perea, was a member of the Fresno County Board of Supervisors and the Fresno City Council.

Electoral history

City council

Mayoral

State assembly

References

1977 births
California city council members
California State University, Fresno alumni
Hispanic and Latino American state legislators in California
Living people
Democratic Party members of the California State Assembly
People from Fresno, California
21st-century American politicians